Michael Allen "Mac" Collins (October 15, 1944 – November 20, 2018) was an American businessman and politician. He was a Republican member of the United States House of Representatives from 1993 to 2005, representing  (previously  from 1993 to 2003). In 2004, he was an unsuccessful candidate for the United States Senate.

Early life
Collins was born in Jackson, Georgia, and joined a concrete products business run by his father after graduating from high school, eventually expanding it into a ready-mix concrete company. His mother was first woman to serve on the Flovilla, Georgia city council. He attended public schools throughout his youth. He served in the Georgia Army National Guard from 1964 to 1970.

Georgia politics and State Senator

Collins began his political career in 1977, when he was elected to the Butts County Commission. He was immediately elected chairman by his colleagues and served two terms, giving up his seat in 1980 when he switched his party affiliation from Democratic to Republican. After losing two elections for Georgia State Senate, he was elected in 1988 from a district in Henry County south of Atlanta and served two terms there.

U.S. House of Representatives

Electoral History 
During the 1990s round of redistricting, Democrats in the Georgia state legislature, bent on getting rid of Newt Gingrich, dismantled his old 6th District.  The new map shifted much of Gingrich's former territory south of Atlanta—including Collins's home—to the 3rd District, which at the time was based in Columbus and represented by five-term Democrat Richard Ray.

Collins immediately jumped into the race. In 1992, he defeated Paul Broun (who would later be elected to Congress from the 10th District) in the Republican primary and then defeated Ray in the general election by almost 10 points.

In 1994, Collins defeated Democrat Fred Overby 66%-34%.

In 1996, he defeated Democrat Jim Chafin 61%-39%.

In 1998, he ran unopposed for reelection.

In 2000, he defeated Democrat Gail Notti 63%-37%.

After the 2000 redistricting cycle, Collins was placed in the 8th District. In 2002, he easily won re-election by the widest margin of his career over Democrat Angelos Petrakopoulos, 78%-22%.

In 2004, he declined to run for re-election, opting to run for U.S. Senate. Lynn Westmoreland succeeded him representing the 8th District.

Congressional Record 
In the United States House of Representatives, Collins was a member of the Ways and Means Committee, Deputy Whip for the Republican Party, and was selected by the Speaker of the House to serve on the highly-classified United States House Permanent Select Committee on Intelligence. He lost his role as Deputy Whip of the United States House of Representatives after the September 11 attacks in 2001 when he informed President George W. Bush that he would not support the creation of the Transportation Security Administration (TSA).

Collins was a sponsor in the passage of two bills. The first, H.R. 1121, designated the Federal building and United States courthouse located at 18 Greenville Street in Newnan, Georgia, as the “Lewis R. Morgan Federal Building and United States Courthouse”. The second, H.R. 1316, amended chapter 87 of title 5, United States Code, with respect to the order of precedence to be applied in the payment of life insurance benefits.

Collins was focused on commerce, tax reform, foreign trade and international finance, and technology legislation.

Later political career

2004 United States Senate campaign

In 2004, Collins was an unsuccessful candidate for the Republican nomination for the United States Senate seat left vacant by the retirement of Senator Zell Miller; it went to Johnny Isakson, who won the Republican primary. With 98 percent of precincts reporting, Isakson had 53% of votes, followed by Herman Cain with 26% and Collins with 21%. Isakson went on to win the general election against Democratic  Congresswoman Denise Majette.

2006 campaign for U.S. House of Representatives

In 2006, Collins moved back to Butts County and made an attempt to return to Congress against Democrat Jim Marshall. This district included none of the territory Collins represented in his first five terms, but three counties that he represented in his last after a mid-decade Republican redistricting. It made for one of the most competitive House races in the nation. he race featured heavy spending, not only by the candidates themselves, but from independent groups. During the campaign, President George W. Bush attended a rally to try to help Collins. Marshall narrowly won reelection by 1,700 votes, 50.5%-49.5%.

Personal life and death
Collins was a Christian and was married to his wife for 54 years. They had four children including Mike Collins who is a U.S. representative for Georgia's 10th congressional district.

Collins died on November 20, 2018, in Flovilla, Georgia at age 74.

References

External links

 Mac Collins papers at the University of West Georgia

1944 births
2018 deaths
20th-century American politicians
21st-century American politicians
American trucking industry businesspeople
American United Methodists
Businesspeople from Georgia (U.S. state)
County commissioners in Georgia (U.S. state)
Georgia National Guard personnel
Georgia (U.S. state) Democrats
Georgia (U.S. state) state senators
People from Jackson, Georgia
Republican Party members of the United States House of Representatives from Georgia (U.S. state)
20th-century American businesspeople
20th-century Methodists